, or known as Mary Bell in some countries, is a Japanese magical girl anime series by Ashi Productions, aired from 1992 until 1993. The series was adapted as a theatrical film and two educational films and the DVD version was released on March 20, 2004.

Story
Yuuri and Ken are two siblings living in the port town of Sunny Bell, where their parents have recently moved and set up a flower shop. They are given the Mary Bell Picture Book from their neighbor Rose, which is a story about two children who get lost in the forest and are helped by a magical girl named Mary Bell. The children wish together that Mary Bell was there to help their parents' struggling flower shop. Suddenly, Mary Bell appears in front of them, introducing herself and her Seelie Court partner Tambourine, and agreeing to help them with magic. Over the course of the series, Mary Bell, Ken, Yuuri, a dog named Ribbon, and the others go on adventures in both Sunny Bell and the Flower Magic World, Mary Bell's home.

The series finale involves the Holy Tree of the Flower Magic World coming to Sunny Bell in order to take away all of the plants on Earth, as it believes is necessary to prevent humans from harming them. Mary Bell and the townspeople are able to convince it not to do this, and Mary Bell decides to stay on Earth and encourage people with magic, even though her goal (to collect the dreams of humans by helping them) has already been completed.

Characters

Main characters

Mary Bell is a "floral magician" from the  an main protagonist and who helps children or others when they are trying to do something. Her catchphrase is 

Tambourine is Mary Bell's magical companion from the seelie court.

 (Yūri),  (Ken)
Yūri and Ken are siblings who befriend Mary Bell.

 
Rose is a nice old lady who believes in fairies who lives alone next door to the Mary Bell flower shop with her dog, Ribbon. When Mary Bell first appeared, Yūri and Ken did not believe she was the real Mary Bell; while she met Mary Bell, Rose immediately told that she wanted to meet her.

 
Ribbon is Rose' dog.

 and 
 (Takuro),  (Remi)
Takuro and Remi are Yūri and Ken's parents who own Mary Bell flower shop.

Bart is a stubborn old man who lives next to Grandma Rose and does not like flowers.

Jito is Bart's 20-year-old nephew who lives in his house. When he was a little child, he got lost and helped by fairies. His friends did not believe him and called him a liar. Since then, Jito keeps trying to capture a fairy to prove that he told the truth.

 
Realistic yet does not believe in fairies, Vivian is Bart's granddaughter who lives in his house. She is about the same age as Yuuri.

 and 
 (Bongo),  (Tap)
Bongo and Tap are Vivian's friends.

 
 (Bra),  (Noppo)
Bra and Noppo are the local policemen.

Maggie Edelweiss is a news reporter implied to be originally from North America who works at the local television station.

 

Professor Sherbour is Mary Bell's professor.

 
Calm and manly, Papabel von Decasse is Mary Bell's father who is known as a genius magician. His magical spell is "Paparin, Berlin, Lan Lan Run".

Mamabel von Decasse is Mary Bell's mother. Her magical spell is "Mamarin, Berlin, Lunrunlun".

Media

Anime
The TV series was produced by TV Setouchi, Big West, and Ashi Productions and directed by Tetsuya Endo, with series composition by Takao Koyama and Hideki Mitsui. The animation directors include Masashi Hirota, Yuriko Chiba, and Kouji Fukazawa. These four supervised about 80% of the 50 episodes.

Episodes

Soundtrack

The soundtrack album,  was released on July 17, 1992.

Track listing

References

External links

1992 anime films
1992 anime television series debuts
1993 anime films
Anime with original screenplays
Ashi Productions
Children's manga
Magical girl anime and manga
TV Tokyo original programming